Chadian cuisine is the cooking traditions, practices, foods and dishes associated with the Republic of Chad. Chadians use a medium variety of grains, vegetables, fruits and meats. Commonly consumed grains include millet, sorghum, and rice as staple foods. Commonly eaten vegetables include okra and cassava. A variety of fruits are also eaten. Meats include mutton, chicken, pork, goat, fish, lamb and beef. The day's main meal is typically consumed in the evening on a large communal plate, with men and women usually eating in separate areas. This meal is typically served on the ground upon a mat, with people sitting and eating around it.

Northern and southern cuisines
Fish is more abundant in southern Chad, including tilapia, perch, eel, carp and catfish. Southern Chadians do not consume many dairy products from livestock, and are not as dependent upon fish as a protein source, but have more options in using fresh produce and spices compared to people in northern Chad. People in Northern Chad include nomadic Arabs and Tuaregs who rely upon staple foods, including dairy products and meats.

Foods and dishes

 Bread made from millet and sorghum that has been ground into flour
 Daraba is a traditional dish prepared with okra, tomatoes, sweet potatoes, greens, peanut butter (or peanut paste), and additional ingredients.
 Dried, salted and smoked fish
 Esh is a common dish among northern Arabs that consists of boiled millet flour served with a moulah sauce.
 Fried beef and fish
 Jarret de boeuf is a traditional beef and vegetable stew. It is recommended to stew for at least 2 hours.
 Kisser is a type of sourdough crêpe
 La Bouillie is a traditional breakfast cereal that is served hot. The main ingredients are rice or wheat, milk, peanut butter and flour.
 Millet pancakes and fried balls. Aiyash is a dish eaten by Chadian Arabs in which millet balls are dipped in various sauces.
 Nile perch
 Okra-based gumbo
 Peanut butter
 Porridges made from millet and sorghum are common throughout the country.
 Red beans are part of the diet in Southern Chad.
 Sauces prepared with meat, fish and spices. Sauces are sometimes used to dip various millet and sorghum foods, such as millet bread.
 Sesame seeds and sesame oil are used in many dishes
 Shea butter
 Squash stew with peanuts
 Stews are often prepared with cassava leaves and okra as the primary greens in them.
 Toasted termites and crickets

Grains
 Millet
 Sorghum
 Rice
 Fonio

Meats

 Beef
 Bushmeat, which is sometimes dried
 Pork
 Chicken
 Fish, particularly in Northern Chad, including tilapia, carp, eel, perch and catfish. Fish is the most common protein source in Chad.
 Goats are the most commonly raised livestock in Chad, and are used for food in the forms of goat meat and goat milk.
 Mutton

Fruits and vegetables

 Bananas, including plantains *
 Carrots 
 Cassava, including cassava leaves 
 Chili peppers 
 Citrus fruits 
 Dates
 Dried pimento
 Garlic
 Green beans 
 Guava * 
 Legumes, including lentils 
 Maize
 Mango * 
 Melon * 
 Okra
 Onion
 Papaya * 
 Peanuts 
 Pineapple * 
 Potato
 Raisins 
 Zucchini

* Particularly common in Southern Chad

Beverages
Tea is the most commonly consumed beverage in Chad. Red, black and green teas are consumed in Chadian cuisine. Karkanji/carcaje is a red tea made from dried hibiscus flowers with ginger, clove, cinnamon and sugar added to taste. It is very common in Chad. Liquor and millet beer are consumed by non-Muslim Chadians in Southern regions of the country. Millet beer is known as bili-bili.

Additional beverages in Chadian cuisine include:
 Fruit juices
 Gala is a beer brewed in Chad
 Jus de Fruit is a traditional beverage prepared with mango, milk, sugar and cardamom powder.
 Milk
 Soft drinks

See also

 African cuisine
 List of African cuisines

References

 
Central African cuisine